Josh Thewlis (born 20 July 1984) is a former Australian rules footballer who played with Sydney in the Australian Football League (AFL).  

Originally from the Victorian country town of Donald, Thewlis played with the Bendigo Pioneers in the elite junior championship the TAC Cup before being drafted at number 50 by Sydney at the 2002 AFL Draft. Thewlis made his senior debut against  in the 2004 AFL season.

He only played two games for Sydney, before he was delisted at the end of the 2004 season.

After leaving the AFL, he continued to play football for South Adelaide in the South Australian National Football League, where he was included in the SANFL Team of the Year in 2011.

References

External links

Living people
1984 births
Australian rules footballers from Victoria (Australia)
Sydney Swans players
South Adelaide Football Club players
Bendigo Pioneers players
People from Donald, Victoria